Tavon may refer to:

Tavon Austin (born 1990), American football player
Tavon Rooks (born 1990), American football player
Tavon Wilson (born 1990), American football player
Tavon Young (born 1994), American football player